This is a list of Guam locations by per capita income. As of the 2010 U.S. Census, Guam had a per capita income of $16,549. In the 2010 Census, Guam had a median household income of $48,274 — the highest of any U.S. territory. The median household income of Guam is higher than in other U.S. territories such as Puerto Rico and American Samoa.

Guam has no counties, and all of Guam is counted as one county-equivalent by the U.S. Census Bureau, so the figures for Guam are the same as for the Guam county-equivalent.

Guam villages ranked by per capita income

Below is all 19 of the villages of Guam ranked by per capita income according to the 2010 U.S. Census results (for 2009 data). The median household income and population of each village is also included.

References

United States locations by per capita income
Economy of Guam